Leil was a legendary king of the Britons as accounted by Geoffrey of Monmouth.  He was the son of King Brutus Greenshield.

Leil was a peaceful and just king and took advantage of the prosperity afforded him by his ancestors.  He founded Carlisle, Cumbria (Caerleil: Fort of Leil) in the north as a tribute to this prosperity. He reigned for twenty-five years until he grew old and feeble.  His inactivity sparked a civil war, during which he died.  He was succeeded by his son Rud Hud Hudibras.

Geoffrey asserts that Leil reigned at the time when Solomon built the Temple in Jerusalem and Silvus Epitus was king of Alba Longa.

References

Legendary British kings